Mara Lakić-Brčaninović (born 18 August 1963 in Gradačac, SFR Yugoslavia) is a Bosnian basketball coach and former basketball player.

Career 
She started her career in Jedinstvo Aida, Tuzla, and played most of her club career for Jedinstvo. With the club she played and won most prestigious European club competition, the EuroLeague Women, in 1989, and played in the 1990 Ronchetti Cup final. She has won a silver medal at the 1988 Summer Olympics with the Yugoslavia women's national basketball team.

References

1963 births
Living people
People from Gradačac
Olympic basketball players of Yugoslavia
Olympic silver medalists for Yugoslavia
Basketball players at the 1988 Summer Olympics
Olympic medalists in basketball
Yugoslav women's basketball players
Bosnia and Herzegovina women's basketball players
Shooting guards
Bosnia and Herzegovina women's basketball coaches

Medalists at the 1988 Summer Olympics
Mediterranean Games gold medalists for Bosnia and Herzegovina
Mediterranean Games medalists in basketball
Competitors at the 1993 Mediterranean Games
ŽKK Jedinstvo Tuzla players